A group of prisoners at the Guantanamo Bay detention camp, the Dirty Thirty were believed to be the "best potential sources of information" and consequently the chief focus of the harshest methods of interrogation.
Many of these captives were alleged to be Osama bin Laden bodyguards, or associates of Osama bin Laden.

References

Guantanamo Bay captives legal and administrative procedures